Jorge Enríquez García (born 8 January 1991) is a former Mexican professional footballer who played as a defensive midfielder. He is an Olympic gold medalist.

Club career

C.D. Guadalajara
Enriquez was born in Mexicali, Baja California, and debuted with Chivas on 5 February 2010 in a match against Pachuca CF, corresponding to week 6 of the Bicentenario tournament. He came on in the 86th minute, replacing Adolfo Bautista. Enríquez scored his first goal in the quarter finals outside the penalty area against Monarcas Morelia.

Club León
On 6 December 2015, Guadalajara announced Enríquez will go on loan to Club León for six months.

Omonia
On 14 June 2018, it was reported Enriquez would be transferred to Omonia.

International career

Jorge Enríquez first played for the Mexico national team at the 2011 CONCACAF U-20 Championship. Mexico won the tournament and qualified to the 2011 Pan American Games.
 
He was part of the U-22 Mexico squad that competed at the 2011 Copa América. They eventually lost at the group stage, being in the last place.

Enríquez represented Mexico once again at the 2011 FIFA U-20 World Cup, they were knocked out of the competition by Brazil at the semifinals, but won the third place beating France. In this tournament Enriquez received the Bronze Ball award coming third in the Tournament's Best Player award.

Chatón was again part of the squad that represented Mexico at the Pan American Games. Mexico won the gold medal beating Argentina at the finals.

In the 2012 Summer Olympics, he became an important piece in the road to the gold medal providing important passes to his partners, he even scored the first goal against Senegal in the quarterfinals.

Career statistics

International

Honours
Guadalajara
Copa MX: Apertura 2015

Mexico Youth
CONCACAF U-20 Championship: 2011
Pan American Games: 2011
CONCACAF Olympic Qualifying Championship: 2012
Toulon Tournament: 2012
Olympic Gold Medal: 2012

Individual
FIFA U-20 World Cup Bronze Ball: 2011

References

External links
  at Chivas Campeon 
 
 
 
 
 
 
 
 

1991 births
Living people
Sportspeople from Mexicali
Footballers from Baja California
Association football midfielders
Mexican footballers
Mexico under-20 international footballers
Mexico youth international footballers
Mexico international footballers
Footballers at the 2011 Pan American Games
2011 Copa América players
2013 CONCACAF Gold Cup players
Olympic footballers of Mexico
Footballers at the 2012 Summer Olympics
Olympic gold medalists for Mexico
Olympic medalists in football
Medalists at the 2012 Summer Olympics
Pan American Games gold medalists for Mexico
Pan American Games medalists in football
C.D. Guadalajara footballers
Coras de Nayarit F.C. footballers
Club León footballers
Santos Laguna footballers
Club Puebla players
Liga MX players
Segunda División B players
Medalists at the 2011 Pan American Games